This was the first of four editions of the tournament in the 2021 ATP Challenger Tour calendar.

Zdeněk Kolář won the title after defeating Gastão Elias 6–4, 7–5 in the final.

Seeds

Draw

Finals

Top half

Bottom half

References

External links
Main draw
Qualifying draw

Open de Oeiras - 1
Open de Oeiras